William Chater (19 September 1821 – 7 March 1880) was an organist, composer, conductor and teacher from Coventry.

Life
Chater was born in Coventry, the son of Edward and Ann Chater. He was the conductor of the Coventry Choral Society for many years.

Appointments
Organist of Vicar Lane Chapel, Coventry
Organist of St John the Baptist Church, Coventry
Organist of Christ Church, Coventry ???? - 1866
Organist at Holy Trinity Church, Coventry 1866 - 1880

Works
Chater wrote songs, chants, chorales and anthems including:
Blessed is he that remembereth the Poor. Anthem.
By the Waters of Babylon. Anthem.

References

1821 births
1880 deaths
English organists
British male organists
English composers
19th-century British composers
19th-century English musicians
Musicians from Coventry
19th-century British male musicians
19th-century organists